The History of the Britons is a purported history of the indigenous British (Brittonic) people that was written around 828 and survives in numerous recensions that date from after the 11th century. The Historia Brittonum is commonly attributed to Nennius, as some recensions have a preface written in his name. Some experts have dismissed the Nennian preface as a late forgery, arguing that the work was actually an anonymous compilation.

Overview 
The Historia Brittonum describes the supposed settlement of Britain by Trojan expatriates and states that Britain took its name after Brutus, a descendant of Aeneas. The work was the "single most important source used by Geoffrey of Monmouth in creating his Historia Regum Britanniae" and via the enormous popularity of the latter work, this version of the earlier history of Britain, including the Trojan origin tradition, would be incorporated into subsequent chronicles for the long-running history of the land, for example the Middle English Brut of England, also known as The Chronicles of England.

The work was the first source to portray King Arthur, who is described as a dux bellorum ('military leader') or miles ('warrior, soldier') and not as a king. It names the twelve battles that Arthur fought, but unlike the Annales Cambriae, none are assigned actual dates.

The reference in the Historia Brittonum of Arthur carrying the image of St. Mary on his shoulders during a battle has been interpreted by later commentators as a mistake for Arthur bearing the image of Mary on his shield, the error being caused by the similarity between the words in Welsh.

The great classicist of the 19th century, Theodor Mommsen, divided the work into seven parts: Preface (Prefatio Nennii Britonum); I. The Six Ages of the World (de sex aetatibus mundi) (§1-6); II. History of the Britons (historia Brittonum) (§7-49); III. Life of Patrick (vita Patricii) (§50-55); IV. Arthuriana (§ 56); V. Genealogies (regum genealogiae cum computo) (§c. 57–66); VI. Cities of Britain (civitates Britanniae) (§66a); VII. Wonders of Britain (de mirabilibus Britanniae) (§67—76).

The Historia Brittonum can be dated to about 829. The work was written no earlier than the "fourth year of [the reign of] king Mermenus" (who has been identified as Merfyn Frych ap Gwriad, king of Gwynedd). Historians have conservatively assigned 828 to the earliest date for the work, which is consistent with the statement in chapter 4 that "from the Passion of Christ 796 years have passed. But from his Incarnation are 831 years".

The text makes use of two narrative techniques which are generally considered not reliable by modern academic standards: synthesizing and synchronizing history. Synthetic history combines legendary elements with fact, which makes the veracity of the text challenging to evaluate. Various specious causal connections and attempts to synchronize material from different sources and traditions also contribute to undermining the reliability of the chronicle.

Authorship, recensions and editions 
The question of the nature of the text of the Historia Brittonum is one that has caused intense debate over the centuries. Some scholars have taken the position that treating the text as anonymously written would be the best approach as theories attributing authorship to Nennius have since been disputed by subsequent scholars.

The classical debate
Repudiating the so-called vindication of Nennius in 1890 by the Celtic scholar Heinrich Zimmer, Mommsen returned to the earlier view of a ninth century Nennius merely building on a seventh century original, which he dated to around 680. The historian Ferdinand Lot swiftly challenged Mommsen; but it was not until 1925 that the Anglo-Saxon scholar Felix Liebermann offered a major reconstruction of the Mommsen view, arguing that Nennius in fact first put the whole work into shape in the ninth century. Re-analysing the eleven manuscript variants of Mommsen, he produced a two-stemma analysis of their hypothetical descent, noting however that “Only one branch, viz. C2d2 of the second stem, preserves Nennius's name”. His overall conclusion (based on uniform particularities of style) was that “The whole work...belongs to Nennius alone”, but this did not prevent him from recognising that “we must lower Nennius's rank as a historian...[but] praise his patriotic heart.

Recent re-assessments
The Nennius question was re-opened in the 1970s by Professor David Dumville. Dumville revisited the stemmatics of the various recensions (he published the Vatican version). Dumville branded the Nennian preface (Prefatio Nennii) a late forgery, and believes that the work underwent several anonymous revisions before reaching the forms that now survive in the various families of manuscripts. Dumville's view is largely accepted by current scholarship, though not without dissent. Peter Field in particular has argued for the authenticity of the preface, suggesting that it was left out of many recensions because it was seen as derogatory to British scholarship. However, Field believes Liebermann's earlier argument for Nennius's authorship in  still bears consideration.

The compiler's approach 
Various introductory notes to this work invoke Nennius's (or the anonymous compiler's) words from the Prefatio that "I heaped together (coacervavi) all I could find" from various sources, not only concrete works in writing but "our ancient traditions" (i.e. oral sources) as well. This is quoted from the Apologia version of the preface. Giles's translation rendered this as "I put together", obscuring the fact that this is indeed a quote from the work and not from some commentator (See Morris's more recent translation as given in wikiquote: Historia Brittonum). Leslie Alcock was not the first to draw attention to the phrase though he may have started the recent spate of interest. However the author still clearly aimed to produce a synchronizing chronicle.

Arthuriana
The Historia Brittonum has drawn attention because of its role in influencing the legends and myths surrounding King Arthur. It is the earliest source that presents Arthur as a historical figure, and is the source of several stories which were repeated and amplified by later authors.

Vortigern and Ambrosius
The Historia contains a story of the king Vortigern, who allowed the Saxons to settle in the island of Britain in return for the hand of Hengist's daughter. One legend recorded of Vortigern concerns his attempt to build a stronghold near Snowdon, called Dinas Emrys, only to have his building materials disappear each time he tries. His advisers tell him to sprinkle the blood of a boy born without a father on the site to lift the curse. Vortigern finds such a youth in Ambrosius, who rebukes the wise men and reveals that the cause of the disturbance is two dragons buried under the ground.

The tower story is repeated and embellished by Geoffrey of Monmouth in his Historia Regum Britanniae, though he attributes it to Merlin, saying "Ambrosius" is the sage's alternative name. Geoffrey also includes Aurelius Ambrosius, another figure mentioned in the Historia, as a king in his own right, and also includes other characters such as Vortimer and Bishop Germanus of Auxerre.

Arthur's battles
Chapter 56 discusses twelve battles fought and won by Arthur, here called dux bellorum (war leader) rather than king:

Most of these battle sites are obscure and cannot be identified. Some of the battles appear in other Welsh literature, though not all are connected explicitly with Arthur. Others reject this as untenable, arguing instead that the author included battles which were not previously associated with Arthur or perhaps made them up entirely.

A similar story to that attached to Guinnion also appears in the Annales Cambriae; here, Arthur is described as carrying "the cross of our Lord Jesus Christ on his shoulders for three days and three nights…", though here the battle is said to be Badon rather than Guinnon. T. M. Charles-Edwards argues that these accounts both refer to a single source. Other scholars, however, such as Thomas Jones and N. J. Higham, argue that the Annales account is based directly on the Historia, suggesting the name of the battle was switched from the unknown Guinnon to the famous Badon, and that the icon Arthur carries was replaced with a more common one.

The Battle of Mount Badon is associated with Arthur in several later texts, but not in any that predate the Historia. It was clearly a historical battle, being described by Gildas, who does not mention the name of the Britons' leader (he does, however, mention Aurelius Ambrosius as a great scourge of the Saxons immediately prior). Of the other battles, only the Battle of Tribuit is generally agreed to be associated with Arthur in another early Welsh source. Tribuit appears as Tryfrwyd in the Old Welsh poem Pa Gur?, dating to perhaps the mid-ninth century. In this poem, it follows the story of a battle against , or dogheads, whom Arthur's men fight in the mountains of Eidyn (Edinburgh); in the Tryfrwyd battle they spar with a character named Garwlwyd (Rough-Gray), who is likely identical with the Gwrgi Garwlwyd (Man-Dog Rough-Grey) who appears in one of the Welsh Triads. Arthur's main protagonist in the fight is Bedwyr, later known as Sir Bedivere, and the poem also mentions the euhemerized god Manawydan. "The City of the Legion" may be a reference to Caerleon, whose name translates as such, but it might also refer to Chester, the site of a large Roman base.

Cat Coit Celidon is probably a reference to the Caledonian Forest (Coed Celyddon) which once covered the Southern Uplands of Scotland. Scholar Marged Haycock has suggested this battle can be identified with the Cad Goddeu, the "Battle of the Trees", best known from the tenth-century poem Cad Goddeu. Arthur is mentioned towards the end of this poem, and a fragment of a story about the battle preserved in manuscript Peniarth 98B states that the battle had an alternate name, Cad Achren, which suggests a connection with the Caer Ochren raided by Arthur in the earlier poem Preiddeu Annwfn.

Various writers have asserted that this chapter supports a historical basis for King Arthur and have tried to identify the twelve battles with historical feuds or locales (see Sites and places associated with Arthurian legend). On the other hand, Caitlin Green argues that the only identifiable battles linked explicitly with Arthur in Old Welsh sources are mythological, undermining any claims that the battles had a basis in history.

Mirabilia
Attached to the Historia is a section called De mirabilibus Britanniae (or simply Mirabilia for short).
It gives a list of 13 topographical marvels, or wonders of Britain,\ followed by a few marvels of Anglesey (Menand insulae or Mona) and of Ireland.

The Mirabilia section is thought to be not part of the original work, but to have been composed shortly after,<ref>e.g., Geoffrey Ashe, under entry "Nennius", in: Lacy, Norris J., ed., The Arthurian Encyclopedia", Peter Bedrick Books, 1986</ref> and is attached to many, though not all of the manuscripts.

Two of the marvels are Arthurian lore (Chapter 73 of the Historia). It might be worth noting that old editions give "Troynt" as the name of the great boar and "Anir" as the name of Arthur's tragic son, from the Harleian manuscript, but Fletcher suggested the variant readings "Troit" and "Amr" be preferred (since they are closer to the Welsh forms of those names).
 
The first concerns Arthur's dog, Cabal (Cavall in Welsh) and the footprint it left while chasing the boar Troynt (→Troit) Twrch Trwyth:

 
The second concerns Arthur's son Anir or Amr (Amhar in Welsh) and his sepulchre:

Germanus
There are also chapters relating events about Saint Germanus of Auxerre that claim to be excerpts from a (now lost) biography about this saint, a unique collection of traditions about Saint Patrick, as well as a section describing events in the North of England in the sixth and seventh centuries which begins with a paragraph about the beginnings of Welsh literature (ch. 62):

Associated works

There are a number of works that are frequently associated with the Historia Brittonum, in part because some of them first appear with the text preserved in the Harleian manuscript, and partly because whenever the Historia Britonum is studied, these sources eventually are mentioned.

The Frankish Table of Nations. Written around 520, this is a short genealogical text in the mould of the Biblical Table of Nations. Both tables are incorporated into the genealogical sections of the Historia. The Frankish Table transmits to the Historia some information derived from Tacitus' Germania, albeit in garbled form. It is probably Byzantine in origin.
The Lebor Bretnach. An Irish translation of the Historia Brittonum ( ed. tr.), and a recension of the 'Nennian' Historia Brittonum.
The Annales Cambriae. This is a chronicle consisting of a series of unnumbered years, from AD 445 to 977, some of which have events added. Two notable events are next to AD 516, which describes The Battle of Badon, and 537, which describes the Battle of Camlann, "in which Arthur and Mordred fell." A version of this was used as a starting point for later Welsh Chronicles.
Welsh Genealogies. One of many collections of Welsh genealogies, this documents the lineage of Hywel Dda, king of Wales, and several of his contemporaries. The Pillar of Eliseg is frequently discussed in connection with these genealogies.
Anglo-Saxon Genealogies, a collection of genealogies of the kings of five pre-Viking kingdoms – Bernicia, Deira, Kent, East Anglia, and Mercia.  A similar collection either derived from or sharing a similar source with this collection is found in the stand-alone Anglian collection of royal pedigrees, and embedded within annals of the Anglo-Saxon Chronicle.

Notes

Citations

References

Primary sources
Mirabilia only
(tr.) 
(tr.) 

Texts and translations
(ed.) 
 reprinted, with emendations, in *
(ed., tr.)  (lacks Mirabilia)
(ed.) 
(ed., tr.) 
Nennius's History of the Britons (Giles tr.) in Six Old English Chronicles, 1, (1848) (Mirabilia section is edited but untranslated).
(ed.)  w:Monumenta Historica Britannica
(ed., tr.)   (includes Mirabilia).
(ed.)  google
Latin library
(tr.) 
(ed.,tr.) 
(ed.) 
(ed.) 
(tr.) wikisource:History of the Britons (composite of Gunn, Giles, and others).

Secondary sources
General and dictionaries
;
; article "Nennius" by GA (Geoffrey Ashe).

Manuscript catalogues
 
  ( Rolls Series:Rerum Britannicarum medii Ævi Scriptores (Chronicles and Memorials of Great Britain and Ireland during the Middle Ages)), p. 318- (#776-).

Critical studies

{{citation|last=Dumville|first=David N.|year=1974|title=Some aspects of the chronology of the Historia Brittonum|journal=Bulletin of the Board of Celtic Studies|volume=25|issue=4|pages=439–45}}
 Alt URL,

)

Further reading
P. J. C. Field, 'Nennius and His History' Studia Celtica 30 (1996) 159-65

External links
 Keith Fitzpatrick-Matthews’s reconstructed original text
 Historia Brittonum in English
 Historia Brittonum in Latin
 Vortigern Studies, Robert Vermaat
 The Wonders of Britain: The de mirabilibus britanniae section, with details
 The Historia Brittonum in a freely-distributable PDF document
 

9th-century history books
Arthurian literature in Latin
Sub-Roman Britain
Welsh chronicles
Welsh mythology
9th-century Latin books